The 1973 Cleveland Indians season was the 73rd in the franchise's history. The club finished in sixth place in the American League East.

Offseason 
In January, Vernon Stouffer sold the Cleveland Indians to Nick Mileti for $10 million. It was $1.4 million more than the group led by George Steinbrenner had offered in December 1971.

Notable transactions 
 October 19, 1972: Eddie Leon was traded by the Indians to the Chicago White Sox for Walt Williams.
 November 27, 1972: Graig Nettles and Jerry Moses were traded by the Indians to the New York Yankees for John Ellis, Jerry Kenney, Charlie Spikes, and Rusty Torres.
 November 30, 1972: Del Unser and Terry Wedgewood (minors) were traded by the Indians to the Philadelphia Phillies for Oscar Gamble and Roger Freed.
 November 30, 1972: Tom Ragland was traded by the Texas Rangers to the Cleveland Indians for Vince Colbert.
 March 8, 1973: Alex Johnson was traded by the Indians to the Texas Rangers for Rich Hinton and Vince Colbert.
 March 24, 1973: Ray Fosse and Jack Heidemann were traded by the Indians to the Oakland Athletics for Dave Duncan and George Hendrick.

Regular season 
 John Adams started to drum at Cleveland Stadium on August 24, 1973, when the Indians played the Texas Rangers. Cleveland won, 11–5. Ever since, Adams has sat in the highest bleacher seat in left center field with his bass drum and has been a fixture for the team.

Season standings

Record vs. opponents

Notable transactions 
 May 4, 1973: Jerry Kenney was released by the Indians.
 June 12, 1973: Lowell Palmer was traded by the Indians to the New York Yankees for Mike Kekich.

Opening Day Lineup

Roster

Player stats

Batting
Note: G = Games played; AB = At bats; R = Runs scored; H = Hits; 2B = Doubles; 3B = Triples; HR = Home runs; RBI = Runs batted in; AVG = Batting average; SB = Stolen bases

Pitching
Note: W = Wins; L = Losses; ERA = Earned run average; G = Games pitched; GS = Games started; SV = Saves; IP = Innings pitched; R = Runs allowed; ER = Earned runs allowed; BB = Walks allowed; K = Strikeouts

Awards and honors 

All-Star Game

Farm system

Notes

References 
1973 Cleveland Indians team page at Baseball Reference
1973 Cleveland Indians team page at www.baseball-almanac.com

Cleveland Guardians seasons
Cleveland Indians season
Cincinnati Indians